George William Brain was an Australian politician and member of the New South Wales Legislative Assembly. He was the longest-serving member for Willoughby, serving from 1943 until his retirement in 1968. Brain was recognised as one of the primary forces in establishing the Free Library Movement in New South Wales.

Early years 
Brain was born 18 January 1893 in Picton. The eldest of nine children, he left school at 13 years of age to work in Scone dairying. At about 20 years of age, he moved to Sydney to look for work and delivered milk at Mascot until all his possessions were stolen forcing him to return home to his parents at Mudgee. These early hardships were critical in forming the substance of the man and Brain was left with a resolute determination to educate himself and a realisation of the importance of access to education to all people regardless of their wealth and status. Such experience motivated his subsequent passion for the free library movement and its importance in society.

Brain studied book-keeping of an evening by the light of a slush light after working 16 hours straight during the day. On moving to the Sydney suburb of Willoughby in 1920 after his marriage to Paula Merkle in 1918, he passed his accountancy examinations and formed the partnership of Brain and Noble chartered accountants. From 1918, he took an active interest in the Progress Association, P&C association and political parties and thus began his political career.

In the 1930s, Brain together with George Morris of Eastern Valley Way, Willoughby promoted the "free milk movement for school children", a scheme which relieved parents financially during the depression and ensured the health of generations of children. In 1941, Brain was the president of the "Monster war carnival" held at Willoughby park. The carnival which was opened by the Rt Hon Billy Hughes raised in excess of £1,000 sufficient at this time to buy two ambulances for the war effort.

Political life 
Before entering the NSW Parliament, Brain was elected in 1941 as an Alderman for the Middle Harbour ward, Municipality of Willoughby where he served with distinction until his entry into NSW Parliament in September 1943.

On the death of the former member, Edward Sanders, Brain won the by election held in September 1943 and all subsequent elections including that held on 1 May 1965. Prior to his retirement in January 1968, he fought nine elections and on each occasion was returned with a larger majority, possibly a record in NSW parliament and certainly a testimony to his dedication and to the faith in which he was held by the voters of Willoughby.

Brain's maiden speech in the NSW parliament implored the parliament to act on the recommendations of the Munn-Pitt report which was scathing in its assessment on the current state of libraries in this country. He had on his own initiative already convened a meeting of like minded individuals in the Willoughby electorate and thus the free library movement of NSW was formed in Willoughby. A subsequent committee was formed with Brain as the Secretary culminating in the drafting of a bill for submission and acceptance by the NSW parliament.

Premier Robert Askin said "memories of his struggle for a higher education—and it was a struggle, as will be appreciated by all those who knew something of his early life—remained with George all his life. They prompted him to work vigorously for the establishment of free libraries. He was dedicated to his work. He regarded free libraries as one of the best means of adult self education." Brain considered the achievement of the free library scheme as "one of the State's greatest social triumphs".

Sporting life 
Brain was a keen sportsman and later in his life bowls became a passion. As expected from a servant of the people, even in relaxation he could not resist contributing selflessly. His many achievements included being a founder and patron of Willoughby Park bowling club, patron of Valley View bowling club, member of the State parliamentary bowling club of which he was president in 1967–68.

Tribute to a servant of Willoughby 
Brain died in his sleep on his 76th birthday in Willoughby. His funeral was held on 21 January 1969 and to that date was the largest that had occurred in the municipality of Willoughby. One month later, Premier Askin, leader of the opposition, Pat Hills and others paid tribute to this outstanding servant of the people of Willoughby. 

During his lifetime, he was the recipient of the King George V Silver Jubilee Medal, the King George VI Coronation Medal and the Queen Elizabeth II Coronation Medal.

Gladys Berejiklian, a subsequent Member of State Parliament for Willoughby (2003-2021) and NSW Premier (2017-2021), honoured George W Brain in her maiden (now inaugural) speech making reference to George's contribution to The Free Library Movement in NSW and his commitment to ensuring the right to education for rich and poor alike. In this speech. Gladys pledged her own commitment to ensuring that a fitting tribute to George be established in the electorate of Willoughby.

Willoughby Council honoured Brain in 2008 by naming a lane after him (George Brain lane, see external link). A display of permanent pertinent memorabilia and historical items associated with Brain's political career and the Free Library Movement in which the above medals are displayed (loaned to Chatswood library by the Brain family) was unveiled on 24 November 2011. It is hoped that other items owned by George currently on display at Mudgee Historical Museum will ultimately be added to the Chatswood library collection.

In 1977, a letter from the then Chief Librarian of Willoughby library, John Flint to George Brain's son Paul, detailed that the Council of that day had resolved that some form of substantial permanent recognition of George Brain's role in the Free Library Movement would be made in the new library (of that day). Whilst at this stage, the significant contribution made by Brain to the municipality of Willoughby has not been recognised by naming a room within the new Chatswood library after him, it is hoped that one day the promise made in 1977 may yet still be fulfilled and it would be most appropriate if the magnificent George Brain collection was ultimately held within a room named after him.

References 

 Blatch, Rayleen. (2002) From felony to freedom. 2nd edition.
 Brain, George W. (1943) Drafts and notes of maiden speech of George W Brain.
 Brain, Paul W. George William Brain, JP:FCA.,F.I.C.A.,MLA for Willoughby in the N.S.W Parliament- September 1943 to January 1968 (ret). A paper for the Masonic Society of NSW.
 Russell, Eric. (1966) Willoughby A Centenary History. Pub. by The Council of the Municipality of Willoughby.

External links
 Willoughby Electoral History. 
 Gladys Berejiklian, Maiden speech in Hansard. 
 Location of George Brain lane, Willoughby.
 

Australian accountants
20th-century Australian philanthropists
1893 births
1969 deaths
Members of the New South Wales Legislative Assembly
Liberal Party of Australia members of the Parliament of New South Wales
20th-century Australian politicians